A military vehicle is any vehicle for land-based military transport and activity, including combat vehicles, both specifically designed for or significantly used by military. Most military vehicles require off-road capabilities and/or vehicle armor, making them heavy. Some have vehicle tracks instead of just wheels; half-tracks have both. Furthermore, some military vehicles are amphibious, constructed for use on land and water, and sometimes also intermediate surfaces.

Military vehicles are almost always camouflaged, or at least painted in inconspicuous color(s). In contrast, under the Geneva Conventions, all non-combatant military vehicles, such as military ambulances and mobile first aid stations, must be properly and clearly marked as such. Under the conventions, when respected, such vehicles are legally immune from deliberate attack by all combatants.

Historically, militaries explored the use of commercial off-the-shelf (COTS) vehicles, both to gain experience with commercially available products and technology, and to try to save time in development, and money in procurement. A subtype that has become increasingly prominent since the late 20th century is the improvised fighting vehicle, often seen in irregular warfare.

Military trucks 

A military truck is a vehicle designed to transport troops, fuel, and materiel along asphalted roads and unpaved dirt roads. Military trucks are a crucial part of military logistics. Several countries have manufactured their own models of military trucks, each of which has its own technical characteristics. These vehicles are adapted to the needs of the different armies on the ground. In general, these trucks are composed of a chassis, a motor, a transmission, a cabin, an area for the placement of the load and the equipment, axles of transmission, suspensions, direction, tires, electrical, pneumatic, hydraulic, engine cooling systems, and brakes. They can be operated with a gasoline engine or with a diesel engine, there are four-wheel drive (4x4) vehicles, six wheeled (6x6), eight wheeled (8x8), ten wheeled (10x10) and even twelve wheeled vehicles (12x12).

Types of military vehicles 

Land combat and military transport vehicles include:

See also
 Military transport not primarily used on land:
 Military aircraft
 Military spacecraft
 Naval ships
 Warships
 Camouflage
 List of military vehicles

References